Bnei Sakhnin F.C. (Ihud Bnei Sakhnin; Ittihad Abna Sakhnin) is an Israeli football club based at the Doha Stadium in Sakhnin. They are the most successful club among the Arab-Israeli clubs in the country, having won the State Cup in 2004.

History

Early years
The club was formed in 1991 by a merger of Maccabi Sakhnin and Hapoel Sakhnin. They were promoted to Liga Artzit (then the second tier) in 1997. In 1998–99 they finished in the relegation zone, but were reprieved when Maccabi Jaffa, who had finished bottom of the top division, were relegated three leagues due to financial problems.

In 2002–03 the club finished as runners-up and promoted alongside fellow Israeli-Arab club Maccabi Ahi Nazareth, becoming the joint-second Israeli-Arab club to play in the top flight after Hapoel Tayibe. Promotion was only won on the last day of the season, the club overtaking Hapoel Jerusalem when they won 1–0 away to Maccabi Kiryat Gat, whilst Hapoel were held to a 0–0 draw at Hapoel Ra'anana.

Prior to their first season in the top division, Sakhnin were favourites to be relegated, and it was thought that Nazareth had a better chance of survival. Questions remained as to whether the squad that gained promotion would be able to compete at the top level, along with the added pressures not to become the next Hapoel Taibe (who were relegated in their first season in the top flight, and subsequently suffered financial problems leading to repeated relegations thereafter). They also lost manager Momy Zafran who resigned shortly after the club won promotion, replacing him with Eyal Lahman. In addition, the club had to play games in Haifa's Kiryat Eliezer Stadium, as their home ground in Sakhnin was deemed unfit for the Premier League.

Later successes

The club signed former Maccabi Haifa striker Raffi Cohen and loaned another striker, Lior Asulin from Maccabi Herzliya. Sagi Strauss was brought in to mind the nets from Maccabi Petah Tikva. Despite the gloomy predictions, the club defied the odds, eventually finishing 10th, four points clear of relegation, whilst Nazareth finished bottom. However, the highlight of the season was the State Cup victory, also a first by an Israeli-Arab club. In the final, Sakhnin beat surprise finalists, second division side Hapoel Haifa 4–1. The team gained a reputation for being a tough, combative outfit, similar in style to the Crazy Gang period at English club Wimbledon. Captain and club stalwart Abbas Suan (he had been at the club since its formation, having been part of the Hapoel Sakhnin team since 1994) won particular acclaim, gaining a call-up to the Israel squad, and winning his first cap in February 2004.

The cup win meant that the club became the first Arab team to play in Europe, entering the UEFA Cup. After beating Partizani Tirana 6–1 on aggregate in the second qualifying round, the club faced Newcastle United in the first round. However, Sakhnin were beaten 7–1 on aggregate, including a 5–1 home defeat in a match played at the Ramat Gan Stadium in Ramat Gan due to security concerns.

During the 2004–05 season, with its stadium still under development the club played many of its home matches at Hapoel Nazareth Illit's Municipal Stadium.

During their spell in the top flight, several Sakhnin games were plagued by hooliganism. Despite chairman Ghnaim's stated mission to create a "cultural rainbow" from his football club, games against Beitar Jerusalem were particularly violent, at least partially due to the presence of notoriously anti-Arab supporters of Beitar; when Sakhnin won the State Cup, Beitar fans paid for an obituary to be printed in Israel's leading daily Yediot Aharonot, claiming that Israeli football was dead. On 29 January 2005 Sakhnin fans rioted during a home match (played at Kiryat Eliezer) against Hapoel Tel Aviv after a violent incident on the field between a team official and a referee, who had earlier had sent off two Sakhnin players. As a punishment, the IFA ordered the club to play two games behind closed doors.

Despite a large cash injection made by Israeli businessman Arcadi Gaydamak ($400,000) in the hope of promoting peace and harmony among the citizens of Israel, and a return to their rebuilt home stadium (largely financed by the Emir of Qatar, hence the renaming to Doha Stadium), Sakhnin were relegated at the end of 2005–06 season, finishing nine points from safety.

However, with one of the largest budgets in the division (around five and a half million shekels), the club were amongst the favourites to return quickly to the Premier League, and did so by finishing as runners-up to Kiryat Shmona. In their first season back in the Premier League, they finished fourth, their highest ever league position, qualifying for the Intertoto Cup.
Problems due to political unrest in the region caused the club's leadership to ask for the postponement of Intertoto cup matches in the Summer of 2008, Most of the stars of the team were sold, most notably Maor Buzaglo who signed for Maccabi Tel Aviv.

In the 2018–19 season the club ended dead last. After repromotion one year later the club's 2020–21 season started off painfully, with the first match ending in a 3–0 home loss to Bnei Yehuda. The next week, some of the team's players and management team had to quarantine as a result of COVID-19 pandemic precautions, and they played their away match against Maccabi Netanya with several absent players and no coach. After suffering a 7–0 loss, the greatest defeat in the club's history, the Sakhnin chairman left the administrative division of Ligat Ha'al. Despite a horrible start with just one point after the first six matches and closing the season with four more losses the club could avoid relegation by being one point better than Bnei Yehuda.

In popular culture

The rise of the Bnei Sakhnin F.C. was the subject of a popular documentary film by noted Israeli director Ram Loevy.

The team is also the subject of the critically acclaimed 2010 documentary film "After The Cup: Sons of Sakhnin United", which follows the team after they win the Israel State Cup directed by American Christopher Browne.

Sponsorship
During the 2005–06 season, the club signed a shirt sponsorship deal with Israeli mobile phone company Cellcom. Talks are currently ensuing over continuing the deal even though the chief executive of Cellcom's Arab sector affairs, Suliman Diab, has left his non-executive post with Bnei Sakhnin to join Liga Artzit (third tier) side Bnei Tamra.

The club's budget was bolstered on 15 June 2006 when Gaydamak announced that he would donate two million shekels to the club in hope that they will make a return to Israel's top league.

Support
The fan base of Bnei Sakhnin is smaller in comparison to other Israeli clubs. The majority of fans of Bnei Sakhnin are Palestinians. The Bnei Sakhnin fan club is called Ultras Sakhnin 2003 (US03) or Duha Gate 4–5 (named due to the gate numbers that leads to their stand), it was established in 2003 after they got promoted to the top division. Other fan clubs that they have friendship with is Ultras Hapoel 99 fans of Hapoel Tel Aviv F.C., Ultrà Sankt Pauli 2002 of FC St. Pauli and Ultras Winners 2005 of Wydad Casablanca.

Big matches (especially those against rival club Beitar Jerusalem) can attract large crowds but toward the end of the 2005–06 season when the club was set to be relegated, the attendance at matches declined dramatically. The highest attendance ever to be in a match of Sakhnin was at the 2004 Israel State Cup Final when Ramat Gan Stadium was filled with Arab supporters from Galilee to the far Negev which all of them came to support the club.

Players

Current squad

Foreigners (2022–23)
Only up to six non-Israeli nationals can be in an Israeli club squad. Those with Jewish ancestry, married to an Israeli, or have played in Israel for an extended period of time (e.g. Gustavo Boccoli), can claim a passport or permanent residency which would allow them to play with Israeli status.

 Ante Puljić
 Ange-Freddy Plumain
 Nicolao Dumitru
 Fabian Sporkslede

Coaching staff

Managers
 Azmi Nassar (1999–00)
 Momi Zafran (2002–2005)
 Eyal Lahman (2003–2005)
 Momi Zafran (2005)
 Michael Kadosh (2005–2006)
 Elisha Levy (1 July 2006 – 30 June 2008)
 Freddy David (1 July 2008 – 2008)
 Eyal Lahman (2008–09)
 Eran Kulik (2009 – 19 Oct 2009)
 Marco Balbul (21 Oct 2009 – 30 June 2010)
 Yuval Naim (1 July 2010 – 11 Aug 2010)
 Haim Levy (2010)
  Slobodan Drapić (2010–11)
 Shlomi Dora (4 April 2011 – 10 March 2013)
 Marco Balbul (11 March 2013 – 19 June 2014)
 Guy Levy (19 June 2014)
 Eli Cohen (born 1961) (2014–2015)
 Yossi Abuksis (2015–2017)
 Jairo Swirsky (2017)
 Aiman Khalaila (caretaker) (2017)
 Felix Naim (2017)
 Tal Banin (2018)
 Benny Ben Zaken (2018)
 Amir Turgeman (2018-2019)
 Giorgi Daraselia (2019)
 Eldad Shavit (2019)
 Nissan Yehezkel (2019)
 Nisso Avitan (2020)
 Sharon Mimer (2020-2021)
 Haim Silvas (2021-2022)
 Kobi Refua (2022-)

Titles

 State Cup
 Winners (1): 2003–04
 Toto Cup
 Runners-up (1): 2020–21

Records
Most League Goals: 31 Ahmed Kasoum,(2003–2006)&(2009–2014)
Most League Goals in a Season (individual): 16 Oren Muharer, Liga Leumit, 2000–01
Most Goals scored in a match: 3 Samir Zampir v SK Nes Ziona, 6 March 1999 / 3 Wissam Isami v Hapoel Bat Yam, 21 May 1999 / 3 Oren Muharer v Hapoel Jerusalem, 31 October 1999 / 3 Shlomi Azulay v Maccabi Haifa, 2 April 2016 / 3 Shlomi Azulay v Beitar Jerusalem, 1 May 2016
Most League Goals in a Season (team): 60 2011/12

References

 
Sakhnin
Association football clubs established in 1991
1991 establishments in Israel
Arab-Israeli football clubs